Miguel Raúl Justiniano Abella (born September 29, 1977 in Santa Cruz de la Sierra) is a Bolivian retired football midfielder who played for the Bolivia national team in Copa América 1999 and Copa América 2001.

Club career
At club level Justiniano had two spells with Blooming. During the first period with the millonarios, he won back-to-back national titles. Subsequently, he would also play for Real Mamoré, Oriente Petrolero, Universitario de Sucre, Wilstermann, Bolívar, Guabirá and La Paz where he finished his career in 2009.

International career
As a plus, Justiniano also played for the Bolivia national team between 1999 and 2005, scoring 1 goal in 26 games. He represented his country in 13 FIFA World Cup qualification matches and at the 1999 Confederations Cup.

Honours

Club
 Blooming
 Liga de Fútbol Profesional Boliviano: 1998, 1999
 Bolívar
 Liga de Fútbol Profesional Boliviano: 2006 (A)

References

External links
 

1977 births
Living people
Sportspeople from Santa Cruz de la Sierra
Association football midfielders
Bolivian footballers
Bolivia international footballers
1999 FIFA Confederations Cup players
Club Blooming players
Oriente Petrolero players
Universitario de Sucre footballers
C.D. Jorge Wilstermann players
Club Bolívar players
Municipal Real Mamoré players
Guabirá players
La Paz F.C. players
1999 Copa América players
2001 Copa América players